Étienne Vacherot (29 July 180928 July 1897) was a French philosophical writer.

Life

Vacherot was born of peasant parentage at Torcenay, near Langres in the Haute-Marne département of France.
He was educated at the École Normale, and returned there as director of studies in 1838, after some years spent in provincial schoolmasterships. In 1839 he succeeded his master Victor Cousin as professor of philosophy at the Sorbonne. His Histoire critique de l'école d'Alexandrie (3 vols. 1846–51), was his first and best-known work.  It drew on him attacks from the Clerical party which led to his suspension in 1851. Shortly afterwards he refused to swear allegiance to the new imperial government, and was dismissed from his post. His work La Démocratie (1859) led to a political prosecution and imprisonment.

On 7 March 1868 he was elected to the Académie des sciences morales et politiques. Upon the fall of the Empire, he took an active part in politics, was maire of a district of Paris during the siege, and in 1871 was in the National Assembly, voting as a Moderate Liberal. In 1873 he drew nearer the Conservatives, after which he was never again successful as a parliamentary candidate, though he maintained his principles vigorously in the press.

While a noted freethinker in the 1850s and 1860s, later in life Vacherot had remorse over the growth of atheistic anticlericalism and returned to both Catholicism and monarchism, receiving Catholic burial upon his death.

The Vacherot brothers, André and Marcel, both French tennis champions, were grandsons of Étienne Vacherot.

Philosophy

Vacherot was a man of high character and adhered strictly to his principles, which were generally opposed to those of the party in power. His chief philosophical importance consists in the fact that he was a leader in the attempt to revivify French philosophy by the new thought of Germany, to which he had been introduced by Victor Cousin, but of which he never had more than a second-hand knowledge. Metaphysics he held to be based on psychology. He maintains the unity and freedom of the soul, and the absolute obligation of the moral law. In religion, which was his main interest, he was much influenced by Hegel, and appears somewhat in the ambiguous position of a sceptic anxious to believe. He sees insoluble contradictions in every mode of conceiving God as real, yet he advocates religious belief, though the object of that belief have but an abstract or imaginary existence.

Works
Besides the two works mentioned above, he wrote:
La Métaphysique et la science (1858)
Essais de philosophie critique (1864)
La Religion (1869)
La Science et la conscience (1870)
Le Nouveau Spiritualisme (1884)
La Démocratie libérale (1892)

Notes

French philosophers
Academic staff of the University of Paris
Members of the Académie des sciences morales et politiques
1809 births
1897 deaths
French male non-fiction writers